Dead Man's Cards is a 2006 British underworld drama starring Paul Barber and James McMartin.

Plot

When Tom, James McMartin, suffers a bad eye injury his boxing career comes to an end, and his marriage begins to suffer. After a chance encounter at the gym, Tom is offered a job working as a door man for the same run-down night club as Paul (Paul Barber), a tough-looking man who likes to use his knuckle duster.

Paul is a volatile man with a history of violence. After learning of Tom's background in boxing he takes him under his wing to teach him the ways of being a door man. Tom soon falls in love with the barmaid for the club and his loyalties are put to the ultimate test as Paul gets increasingly more in trouble with violent gangsters from the area.

References

External links
Official site
 

2006 drama films
2006 films
British drama films
2000s English-language films
2000s British films